Travelin' may refer to:

 Travelin' (John Lee Hooker album), 1960
 ''Travelin''' (Chet Atkins album), 1963
 ''Travelin''' (Tommy James and the Shondells album), 1970